Dyspessa rothschildi is a species of moth of the family Cossidae. It is found in Algeria.

References

Moths described in 2011
Dyspessa
Moths of Africa